Too Much may refer to:

Too Much (professional wrestling), later Too Cool, a professional wrestling tag team
Too Much (album) or the title song, by Bonaparte, 2008

Songs
"Too Much" (Arnis Mednis song), representing Latvia at Eurovision 2001
"Too Much" (Blondie song), 2017
"Too Much" (Bros song), 1989
"Too Much" (Carly Rae Jepsen song), 2019
"Too Much" (Cheap Trick song), 2003
"Too Much" (Dave Matthews Band song), 1996
"Too Much" (Drake song), 2013
"Too Much" (Elvis Presley song), 1957
"Too Much" (Pirates of the Mississippi song), 1992
"Too Much" (Spice Girls song), 1997
"Too Much" (Tara Kemp song), 1991
"Too Much" (Zayn song), 2018
"Too Much", by All Time Low from Nothing Personal, 2009
"Too Much", by the Balham Alligators, 1996
"Too Much", by the Easybeats from It's 2 Easy, 1966
"Too Much", by French Montana from Jungle Rules, 2017
"Too Much", by The Game from Doctor's Advocate, 2006
"Too Much", by Ghetto Concept, 1998
"Too Much", by Guy Clark from Boats to Build, 1992
"Too Much", by Kylie Minogue from Aphrodite, 2010
"Too Much", by LMFAO from Party Rock Mansion, 2016
"Too Much", by Kehlani from SweetSexySavage, 2017
"Too Much", by Pepper from Kona Town, 2002
"Too Much", by Sufjan Stevents from The Age of Adz, 2010
"Too Much", by Zion I from Heroes in the City of Dope